EQC may refer to:

Government
 Earthquake Commission of New Zealand
 Evaluation Quality Control of the European Union's Copernicus Climate Change Service (C3S)
 Environmental Quality Council, a part of the Wyoming Department of Environmental Quality

Sports and games
 European Quizzing Championships
 European Quidditch Cup

Other uses
 Equity Commonwealth (NYSE ticker symbol: EQC), a company founded by Sam Zell
 Ecuatorial Cargo (ICAO airline code: EQC) see List of defunct airlines of Equatorial Guinea
 Mercedes-Benz EQC, all-electric car

See also

 EQC-6, an airplane, see Waco Custom Cabin series